Lakeland is a city in Washington County, Minnesota, United States. The population was 1,796 at the 2010 census.

History
Lakeland was platted in 1849.  The 1849 Captain John Oliver House, 1850 Mitchell Jackson Farmhouse, and 1858 John T. Cyphers House are listed on the National Register of Historic Places.

Geography
Interstate 94 and Minnesota State Highway 95 are two of the main routes in the community. Lakeland is located in the St. Croix River Valley. The city of Hudson, Wisconsin is nearby.

Government services
Law enforcement is provided by the Washington County Sheriff's Office. Fire and Rescue services are provided by the Lower St Croix Valley Volunteer Fire Dept. The Lakeland Post Office was established in 1854 and serves the city of Lakeland and the surrounding cities of Lakeland Shores, Lake St. Croix Beach and St Marys Point. The City of Lakeland employs one Permanent Temporary Interim City Clerk.

Demographics

2010 census
As of the census of 2010, there were 1,796 people, 681 households, and 521 families living in the city. The racial makeup of the city was 97.2% White, 0.3% African American, 0.2% Native American, 1.1% Asian, 0.1% Pacific Islander, 0.2% from other races, and 0.9% from two or more races. Hispanic or Latino of any race were 1.2% of the population.

There were 681 households, of which 30.2% had children under the age of 18 living with them, 63.9% were married couples living together, 7.8% had a female householder with no husband present, 4.8% had a male householder with no wife present, and 23.5% were non-families. 17.6% of all households were made up of individuals, and 6.4% had someone living alone who was 65 years of age or older. The average household size was 2.64 and the average family size was 2.99.

The median age in the city was 44.8 years. 22.8% of residents were under the age of 18; 6.6% were between the ages of 18 and 24; 21% were from 25 to 44; 38.3% were from 45 to 64; and 11.3% were 65 years of age or older. The gender makeup of the city was 51.2% male and 48.8% female.

2000 census
As of the census of 2000, there were 1,917 people, 691 households, and 556 families living in the city. The racial makeup of the city was 97.55% White, 0.26% Native American, 0.37% Asian, 0.10% Pacific Islander, 0.21% from other races, and 1.51% from two or more races. Hispanic or Latino of any race were 1.04% of the population.

There were 691 households, out of which 37.9% had children under the age of 18 living with them, 71.9% were married couples living together, 6.4% had a female householder with no husband present, and 19.5% were non-families. 14.3% of all households were made up of individuals, and 3.5% had someone living alone who was 65 years of age or older.  The average household size was 2.77 and the average family size was 3.07.

In the city, the population was spread out, with 26.4% under the age of 18, 6.5% from 18 to 24, 29.2% from 25 to 44, 31.2% from 45 to 64, and 6.6% who were 65 years of age or older.  The median age was 39 years. For every 100 females, there were 100.1 males.  For every 100 females age 18 and over, there were 97.9 males.

The median income for a household in the city was $76,530, and the median income for a family was $79,772. Males had a median income of $50,540 versus $37,222 for females. The per capita income for the city was $30,019.  About 2.1% of families and 3.1% of the population were below the poverty line, including 3.1% of those under age 18 and 4.7% of those age 65 or over.

References

Cities in Minnesota
Cities in Washington County, Minnesota